Quints by Surprise is a reality television show produced in the United States by Megalomedia about the Jones family, consisting of parents Ethan and Casey and their six children, including quintuplets. The show follows the family through their daily lives, focusing on the challenges of raising multiple children. The show premiered on TLC on August 30, 2010.  The family originally appeared in two one-hour specials titled Too Many Babies? and Too Many Babies: How They Do It on Discovery Health, which were later re-aired on TLC under the names Quintuplet Surprise and Quintuplet Surprise: The First 16 Months. The third season premiered on November 8, 2011.

Family history

Ethan and Casey were childhood sweethearts. They first met at a school dance in seventh grade in Denton, Texas, and married at the age of 23 at Grace Temple Baptist Church in Denton, on June 19, 1999. Ethan owns the remodelling company Eliot J Construction and attended an Executive MBA program by Baylor University, graduating in May 2010. Since 2005, the couple has lived in the Steiner Ranch community of Texas. Their desire to start a family was impeded by infertility. It was discovered Ethan suffered an extremely low sperm count. They turned to fertility treatments, using a sperm donor along with intrauterine insemination (IUI). Their first daughter, Eliot McKenna, was born on July 14, 2004.

A different sperm donor was used when the couple decided to conceive a younger sibling for Eliot. Casey underwent IUI for the second time in July 2008. In August 2008, they discovered they were expecting higher order multiples (originally six fetuses were present; one failed to develop). The couple refused selective reduction. The quintuplets were born on January 16, 2009, at Seton Medical Center in Austin: Brooklyn Faith, Britton Grace, Jack William, Lila Addison and Ryan Elizabeth. Over 25 physicians, nurses, and technicians were present for the birth.

Family
Parents
 Ethan Eliot Jones – born February 21, 1976 (age 45)
 Casey Ann Jones (née Krueger) – born September 18, 1975 (age 45)
Anniversary: June 19, 1999
Children

Production
Filming on the first season occurred in late Spring and Summer 2010. The family filmed on average three to four days per week. Season 2 was filmed during December 2010 and January 2011, and included the quintuplets' second birthday. The third season filmed through October 2011, and premiered on November 8. It consists of 6 episodes.

Episodes

Specials

Season 1

Season 2

Season 3

References

External links
 TLC: Quints by Surprise
 JonesLife.net
 

2010 American television series debuts
2011 American television series endings
2010s American reality television series
English-language television shows
Quintuplets
Television series about children
Television series about families
Television shows set in Texas
TLC (TV network) original programming